Keith Faber is an American politician from Ohio. A  Republican, he has been State Auditor of Ohio since 2019. He was formerly a member of the Ohio House of Representatives (2001-2007), elected from the 84th district, and then a member of the Ohio State Senate (2007-2016), elected from the  12th District. He was president of the Ohio Senate from 2013 to 2016.

Life and career

With incumbent Jim Buchy unable to run for another term in the House in 2000, Faber sought to replace him. He faced a primary race with fellow Republican Terry Haworth, and won by about 1,300 votes. He defeated Democrat Bill Sell in the general election by about 14,000 votes. He won reelection in 2002, 2004, and 2006.

When Jim Jordan vacated his state Senate seat after winning a seat in Congress, Faber was one of seven who sought to replace him, along with Derrick Seaver, Gene Krebs, Robert J. Luckey III, Toni Slusser, Vincent Foulk and Kreg Allison. Faber won the support of Senate Republicans, and took the seat in the Senate in February 2007. Soon after the appointment, Senate President Bill Harris appointed Faber to the Senate Finance and Financial Institutions Committee.

For the 128th General Assembly, Faber served as Senate majority floor leader, and in the 129th General Assembly, he served as president pro tempore, the second highest post in the Senate. As President pro tempore, Faber was also vice chairman of the Senate Rules and Reference Committee. Faber won reelection to a second term in 2012, defeating Libertarian Paul Hinds with 79.07% of the vote. Faber served as the 94th President of the Ohio Senate throughout his last term in the upper chamber, before being ineligible to run again in 2016 due to term limits.

In a 2016 survey by Columbus Monthly of Statehouse insiders ("lawmakers, legislative aides, lobbyists, journalists and Kasich administration officials"), Faber was rated "Most Ambitious," "Most Humorless," "Least Compassionate," "Most Arrogant," and "Most Aggressive Campaign Fundraiser."

Ohio House of Representatives
In 2016, state Representative Jim Buchy, who had returned to the House after Faber had succeeded him in 2000, again decided to retire, in what perhaps strategically opened up the seat for Faber, who himself was term-limited from his seat in the Senate, where he had served as the body's president since 2013.  He easily won election, receiving over 83% of the vote against Democrat Ed Huff in the 2016 general election.

Auditor of State

Campaign
In February 2017, Faber announced his intention to run for Ohio Auditor of State. Ohio Speaker of the House Cliff Rosenberger considered running for the Republican nomination for auditor, but chose not to do so. He ran unopposed for the Republican nomination in the May 2018 primary. During his campaign, Faber emphasized performance audits to promote government efficiency.

Faber faced former U.S. Representative Zack Space, the Democratic nominee, in the 2018 campaign for state auditor. In October 2018, the Associated Press published an investigation revealed that Faber and his businesses incurred penalties for tax delinquencies between 2008 and 2015 across multiple properties and years and in two counties. Before Faber's tax payment history came to light, Faber had run digital ads attacking Space for his two tax penalties in 2005 and 2008. Both candidates cited administrative errors as the reason for the late payments. Space's campaign accused Faber of hypocrisy; Faber’s bookkeeper took responsibility for the delays.

On November 6, 2018, Faber was elected State Auditor. Faber received 49.66% of the vote, defeating Space, who received 46.28%.

Tenure
Faber was first inaugurated as auditor on January 12, 2019. He was inaugurated for a second term on January 9, 2023 joined by his family and sworn in by newly elected Chief Justice of the Ohio Supreme Court Sharon Kennedy.

Electoral history

Personal life
Faber's brithday is January 19. He is married to Andrea Faber, and together they have two children.  They reside in Celina, Ohio.

References

External links
The Ohio House of Representatives: Representative Keith Faber
Project Vote Smart - Senator Keith L. Faber (OH) profile
Follow the Money - Keith Faber
2006 2004 2002 2000 campaign contributions

|-

1966 births
21st-century American politicians
Living people
Republican Party members of the Ohio House of Representatives
Republican Party Ohio state senators
Ohio State University Moritz College of Law alumni
Oakland University alumni
People from Celina, Ohio
Presidents of the Ohio State Senate
State Auditors of Ohio